Tender Hooks is a 1989 Australian film directed by Mary Callaghan and starring Jo Kennedy and Nique Needles. It was the directorial debut of Callaghan, who had made an acclaimed short Greetings from Wollongong.

References

External links
Tender Hooks at Ronin Films

Tender Hooks at Oz Movies

Australian drama films
1989 films
1989 directorial debut films
1980s English-language films
1980s Australian films